Stal Stadium may refer to various stadiums in Europe, including:

 Stal Alchevsk Stadium, Alchevsk, Ukraine
 Stadion Edwarda Jancarza, home stadium of speedway team Stal Gorzów Wielkopolski, Poland
 Stadion Stali Mielec, Mielec, Poland
 Stal Stalowa Wola Stadium, Stalowa Wola, Poland